State Line is a town in Greene and Wayne counties, Mississippi, in the United States. The population was 452 at the 2020 census.

History 
A post office was established in 1856, and the town incorporated in 1875. State Line was located on the Mobile and Ohio Railroad, built through Mississippi in the 1850s.

Geography 
State Line is located at  (31.437799, -88.476104). The town is on the border between Wayne County on the north and Greene County on the south, with the town's area approximately equally in both. In the 2010 census, 304 of the town's 565 residents (53.8%) lived in Greene County and 261 (46.2%) in Wayne County.

U.S. Route 45 passes through the northeast corner of the town, leading northwest  to Waynesboro, the Wayne County seat, and southeast  to Mobile, Alabama. Mississippi Highway 57 passes through the east side of State Line, leading south  to Leakesville, the Greene County seat. Mississippi Highway 42 passes through the center of State Line as St. Peter Street, leading west  to Hattiesburg.

Demographics 

As of the 2020 United States census, there were 452 people, 250 households, and 176 families residing in the town.

As of the census of 2000, there were 555 people, 197 households, and 148 families residing in the town. The population density was 130.1 people per square mile (50.2/km). There were 230 housing units at an average density of 53.9 per square mile (20.8/km). The racial makeup of the town was 42.70% White, 56.94% African American, and 0.36% from two or more races.

There were 197 households, out of which 39.1% had children under the age of 18 living with them, 41.1% were married couples living together, 29.9% had a female householder with no husband present, and 24.4% were non-families. 21.8% of all households were made up of individuals, and 9.6% had someone living alone who was 65 years of age or older. The average household size was 2.82 and the average family size was 3.29.

In the town, the population was spread out, with 34.4% under the age of 18, 11.4% from 18 to 24, 26.8% from 25 to 44, 16.8% from 45 to 64, and 10.6% who were 65 years of age or older. The median age was 28 years. For every 100 females, there were 82.6 males. For every 100 females age 18 and over, there were 72.5 males.

The median income for a household in the town was $22,500, and the median income for a family was $27,083. Males had a median income of $26,563 versus $20,625 for females. The per capita income for the town was $9,030. About 28.4% of families and 33.6% of the population were below the poverty line, including 46.9% of those under age 18 and 25.4% of those age 65 or over.

Education 
The Wayne County portion of State Line is served by the Wayne County School District. The Greene County portion is served by the Greene County School District.

Notes

References 

Cities in Greene County, Mississippi
Cities in Wayne County, Mississippi
Cities in Mississippi